The 2013 Regional Women's Twenty20 Championship was the second season of the women's Twenty20 cricket competition played in the West Indies. It took place in August 2013, with 8 teams taking part and all matches taking place in Grenada. Jamaica won the tournament, beating Barbados in the final to claim their second T20 title.

The tournament followed the 2013 Regional Women's Championship.

Competition format 
The eight teams were divided into two groups of four, playing in a round-robin format. Matches were played using a Twenty20 format. The top two teams in each group progressed to the semi-finals, whilst the bottom two teams in each group played-off in two play-off matches.

The group worked on a points system with positions being based on the total points. Points were awarded as follows:

Win: 5 points 
Loss: 0 points.
Abandoned/No Result: 3 points.

Points tables

Group A

Group B

Source: Windies Cricket

Knock-Out Stage

Play-Offs

Semi-finals

Final

Statistics

Most runs

Source: CricketArchive

Most wickets

Source: CricketArchive

References

External links
 Series home at Windies Cricket

Twenty20 Blaze
2013 in West Indian cricket